Icarosaurus (meaning "Icarus lizard") is an extinct genus of kuehneosaurid reptile from the Late Triassic (Norian age) Lower Lockatong Formation of New Jersey. It is closely related to lizards and the tuatara. Based on a partial skeleton missing part of the tail, some ribs, a hand, and parts of the legs, it was a small animal, about 10 centimeters (4 in) long from the skull to the hips. Like its relative Kuehneosaurus, it was able to glide short distances using 'wings' consisting of highly elongated ribs covered with skin. These gliding membranes would have had a convex upper surface and a concave lower surface, thus creating a simple airfoil structure well-suited to gliding. This method of gliding is also seen in Coelurosauravus and the modern Draco, neither of which are closely related to Icarosaurus.

Discovery and history

The only known fossil skeleton which definitely belongs to Icarosaurus was found in 1960 in North Bergen, New Jersey by Alfred Siefker, a teenager at the time, who stumbled upon the specimen while exploring a quarry. Siefker brought the specimen to scientists at the American Museum of Natural History in New York for identification and preparation. It was described by paleontologist Edwin Harris Colbert in 1966, who named it Icarosaurus siefkeri in honor of Siefker.

The fossil remained in the collections of the AMNH until the late 1980s. In 1989, Siefker reclaimed the specimen, which he kept in a private collection during the following decade. In 2000, Siefker sold the fossil at auction in San Francisco through the auction house Butterfield & Butterfield, despite concerns from paleontologists that the sale could render the specimen unavailable for scientific study. The fossil sold for US$167,000, only half of its appraised value, to Dick Spight of California. That same year, Spight donated the Icarosaurus holotype back to the AMNH, where it was put on display 7 October 2000.

References

Triassic lepidosauromorphs
Prehistoric reptile genera
Late Triassic reptiles of North America